Diamond in the Dirt is the debut studio album by English rapper Shystie. It was released on 12 July 2004 and includes the singles "One Wish" and "Make It Easy".

Track listing

References

2004 albums
Shystie albums
Polydor Records albums